The IWBF U23 World Wheelchair Basketball Championship is an international wheelchair basketball competition contested by the men's and women's under-23 national teams of the members of the International Wheelchair Basketball Federation (IWBF), the sport's global governing body. The event is held every four years.

The first official wheelchair basketball world championship for men under-23 was held in 1997 hosted by Toronto, Canada. Only seven nations took part at the tournament. At the next championship held 2001 in Blumenau, Santa Catarina, Brazil, the number of participating nations were six. The 2005 Championship in Birmingham, United Kingdom became a full tournament attended by twelve nations from four zones. 

Junior women under 23 were allowed to play in the men's teams at the third edition of championships in 2005. A bonus of one point was given to the team, which had a female player on the court. However, to develop young women players, it is concluded that separate championships for junior women will be held in the future.

Winners 
National teams of Canada and the United States are both twice champions sofar.

Medal table

See also
 2011 Women's U25 Wheelchair Basketball World Championship
 2015 Women's U25 Wheelchair Basketball World Championship
 2019 Women's U25 Wheelchair Basketball World Championship
 2023 Women's U25 Wheelchair Basketball World Championship

References

  
Wheelchair basketball competitions between national teams
Recurring sporting events established in 1997